Frederick Vettese (born 1953) served as the chief actuary of Morneau Shepell until 2018 and is author of several books exploring Canada's retirement system.

Vettese is the author of The Essential Retirement Guide: A Contrarian's Perspective and has co-authored The Real Retirement: Why You Could Be Better Off Than You Think, and How to Make That Happen with Bill Morneau. In 2018, he published his third book, Retirement income For Life: Getting More without Saving More, with a second edition published in 2020.

He is a regular contributor to Canadian publications such as the Globe and Mail and the National Post and has appeared in several video interviews to discuss Canadian retirement strategies.

Vettese is a Fellow of the Canadian Institute of Actuaries (FCIA).

References 

1953 births
Living people
Canadian actuaries
20th-century Canadian non-fiction writers
The Globe and Mail columnists
National Post people
Writers from Toronto